This is an incomplete list, which will never be able to satisfy particular standards for completeness as it excludes bootlegs, mix tapes and other minor records by independent labels.

Art Farmer was a jazz musician who played trumpet, flugelhorn and flumpet. His appearances on record date from 1948 to 1998 and include more than 60 albums under his own name and more than 70 as a sideman, in addition to a dozen with the Jazztet. His appearances on film are also listed on this page, including his two appearances in Hollywood productions.

Discography
Years refer to the date of Farmer's appearance on the recording.

As leader

With the Jazztet
All feature Benny Golson (tenor sax)

Albums as sideman

Singles as sideman

Filmography
Year recorded gives date of Farmer's appearance. An asterisk (*) indicates that the year is that of release.

References

Jazz discographies
Discographies of American artists